James Nathaniel Hutcheson (February 9, 1857 – January 14, 1909) was an American politician who served in the Virginia House of Delegates and Virginia Senate.

References

External links 

1857 births
1909 deaths
Democratic Party members of the Virginia House of Delegates
19th-century American politicians